English-Albanian singer Dua Lipa has released two studio albums, two reissues, one remix album, five extended plays (EPs), thirty-one singles (including eight as a featured artist), ten promotional singles, two charity singles, and thirty-three music videos. After signing with Warner Bros. Records, she released her debut single "New Love" in 2015. The following year, she gained recognition through the singles "Hotter than Hell" and "Blow Your Mind (Mwah)". In June 2017 Lipa released her eponymous debut studio album, which reached the top 10 charts in Australia, Belgium, Ireland, the Netherlands, New Zealand, Sweden and the United Kingdom. The album's chart-topping hits "Be the One", "New Rules" and "IDGAF" propelled Lipa to international fame.

"New Rules" was Lipa's first number one single in the UK; the charity single "Bridge over Troubled Water", dedicated to victims of the Grenfell Tower fire, on which Lipa performed and also topped the UK Singles Chart. She reissued her album in 2018 as Dua Lipa: Complete Edition, inserting several of her already released collaborations—including "One Kiss" with Calvin Harris, a song which spent eight weeks atop the UK Singles Chart.

In March 2020, Lipa released her second studio album, Future Nostalgia. Later, she supported the album with the release of its remix album Club Future Nostalgia, a collaboration with the Blessed Madonna, and with its reissue Future Nostalgia: The Moonlight Edition. Future Nostalgia reached number one in Australia, Ireland, the Netherlands, New Zealand and the UK. Its lead single "Don't Start Now" was a commercial success, reaching the top 10 in several international markets and number one in Ireland. On the UK Singles Chart, the song became the longest top 10 stay for a British female artist and the longest top 10 stay without reaching the summit in that chart's history. In April 2020, the song alongside follow-up singles "Physical" and "Break My Heart" were simultaneously in the top 10 of the UK Singles Chart; she is the fifth female artist to have three singles simultaneously in the top ten.

As part of the Live Lounge Allstars, Lipa participated in the COVID-19 pandemic-relief charity single "Times Like These", which reached number one in the UK. "Levitating" from Future Nostalgia was a commercially successful single worldwide peaking at number two on the Billboard Global 200 chart, while also becoming the second longest running top 10 single and longest running without reaching number one in Billboard Hot 100 history. "Fever", a collaboration with Angèle from the album's French edition, tied the record for the longest running number one single on Belgium's Ultratop Wallonia singles chart. Lipa collaborated with Elton John on "Cold Heart (Pnau remix)" which became her third number one single in the UK while also reaching the top ten of several international charts.

Albums

Studio albums

Reissues

Remix albums

Extended plays

Singles

As lead artist

As featured artist

Promotional singles

Charity singles

Other charted songs

Music videos

See also
List of songs recorded by Dua Lipa

Notes
Notes for albums and songs

Notes for peak chart positions

References

External links

Discography
Discographies of Albanian artists
Discographies of British artists
Pop music discographies